The Great Wide Open is a "mini-album" from Funeral for a Friend, the title track taken from the album Tales Don't Tell Themselves. Originally planned as the third single from the album (as announced in a news post on 14 August 2007), it was later deferred by two weeks and expanded to a mini-album in order to release the live tracks recorded in August (see below).

Music video
The song's music video shows the band playing in a little shack lost on a beach at night with waves resting on the shore. Around the middle of the video, some green, red and white lights flash throughout the house.

Mini-album
Atlantic Records released a very special mini album on 15 October 2007. Entitled 'The Great Wide Open', it  includes the track of the same name from the 'Tales Don't Tell Themselves' album as well as the video that is currently in rotation but also 8 classic live tracks - the 1st 2 EPs 'Between Order & Model' and 'Four Ways to Scream Your Name' - in full recorded live at the Barfly in London in August 2007. These tracks are not available anywhere else and are exclusive to this release.

Track listing

External links
 "The Great Wide Open" music video on YouTube
 "Mini-Album press release"

Funeral for a Friend albums
2007 EPs
Atlantic Records EPs
Albums produced by Gil Norton
Albums produced by Romesh Dodangoda